Vecchiato is a surname. Notable people with the surname include:

Mario Vecchiato (born 1948), Italian hammer thrower
Renzo Vecchiato (born 1955), Italian basketball player

Italian-language surnames